Priacma is a genus of beetles in the family Cupedidae. It contains a single extant species, Priacma serrata native to western North America and one fossil species, P. megapuncta from the Cenomanian aged Burmese amber. Species previously assigned to the genus from the Yixian Formation of China have been subsequently placed in the separate genus Apriacma.

References

External links
 ION
 Nomenclator Zoologicus

Cupedidae
Archostemata genera